Halima Cissé (born 21 March 1996) is the Malian mother to the world's only known nonuplets that have survived birth.

Early life 
Cissé was born in Timbuktu, Mali. Prior to the birth of her nonuplets, she had one daughter with her husband, Adjudant Kader Arby, an army officer. As of 2021, she was a student.

Multiple births
When she was 25 year old, doctors believed that Cissé was pregnant with seven foetuses. On 30 March 2021, interim president Bah Ndaw instructed the Government of Mali to transport Cissé to Casablanca, Morocco in order to give birth. 

On 4 May 2021 her nine nonuplets were born prematurely at 30 weeks, by caesarean section and weighed between 500g and 1kg. The birth date had been postponed as late as possible to increase the chance of the babies' surviving. The children were cared for in the Ain Borja clinic in Casablanca, Cissé was also provided with medical care for one month and required surgery after the birth.

Her children are four boys named Muhammad, Bah, El Hadj and Oumar, and five girls named Adama, Hawa, Fatouma, Oumou, and Kadidia.
According to the parents and medical staff, the nine babies were conceived naturally, unlike e.g. the Suleman octuplets (who were conceived by IVF).

See also 
 List of multiple births
 Nadya Suleman - mother of first surviving octuplets.

References 

Living people
Malian people
Multiple births
1996 births
People from Timbuktu